Cesta Básica is a box compilation of the Brazilian band Raimundos. It was launched in 1996, consisting of a comic book, a VHS tape and a CD-ROM. Its name comes from the Brazilian "cesta básica" (trans. lit.: "basic basket"), a bundle of food items such as rice, beans, noodles, sugar and salt, commonly distributed by the government to poor families, as well as by companies as a supplement to a worker's income.

Track listing
"Infeliz Natal" (Unmerry Christmas)
"A Sua" (Yours)
"Papeau Nuky Doe"
"Merry Christmas (Ramones cover)"
"Bodies (Sex Pistols cover)"
"Puteiro em João Pessoa (Remix)" (Brothel in João Pessoa (remix))
"Esporrei na Manivela (Ao Vivo no festival Hollywood Rock de 1996)" (I came on the crank (Live at Hollywood Rock of 1996))
"Bê a Bá (Ao Vivo no festival Hollywood Rock de 1996)" (Bê a Bá (Live at Hollywood Rock of 1996))
"Cajueiro (Ao Vivo no festival Hollywood Rock de 1996)" (Cashew tree (Live at Hollywood Rock of 1996))
"Palhas do coqueiro (Ao Vivo no festival Hollywood Rock de 1996)" (Coconut-tree leaves (Live at Hollywood Rock of 1996))

Personnel
 Digão - lead guitar, vocals
 Rodolfo - lead vocals, rhythm guitar
 Canisso - bass guitar
 Fred - drums

1996 albums
Raimundos albums